Dehdulan (also Romanized as Dehdūlān; also known as Dehdolān) is a village in Sharabian Rural District, Mehraban District, Sarab County, East Azerbaijan Province, Iran. At the 2006 census, its population was 150, in 32 families.

References 

Populated places in Sarab County